Preliminary may refer to:

 Preliminary internships
 Preliminary English Test
 Preliminary finals
 Preliminary hearing
 Preliminary Notice

See also
Preliminary examination (disambiguation)